Pterophorus volgensis is a moth of the family Pterophoridae. It is found in Russia (including the Ural Mountains).

The wingspan is 18–20 mm. The forewings are white with brownish-grey spots. The hindwings are brownish-grey.

The larvae feed on Rindera tetraspis.

References

Moths described in 1862
volgensis